This is a list of characters from Nexo Knights.

Nexo Knights
The Nexo Knights are the defenders of Knighton. The Nexo Knights fight the forces of Jestro and Monstrox. Among the members of the Nexo Knights are:

 Clay Moorington (voiced by Giles Panton) – Clay Moorington is the leader of the Nexo Knights. Clay is no-nonsense and lives by the Knight's Code, dedicated to being the best knight he can (having dreamed of it since being a young orphan). His strictly regimented style occasionally causes him to clash with his fellow knights, particularly the more laid back Lance. His armor is blue and his crest shows a falcon and his signature weapon is a Claymore, which has the ability to supercharge into the "Sword of Strength". Clay rides around in the Rumble Blade, a large vehicle with two sidecars and a plane shaped like a sword that splits off into smaller vehicles. Beginning in "The Cloud," Clay drives the Falcon Fighter Blaster, a fighter jet with bladed wings. Starting in "A Little Rusty," Clay is affected by the Cloud of Monstrox's dark magic which slowly transforms him to stone, causing him to look for a successor. The transformation is completed in "Rock Bottom" and Aaron covers for Clay until a way to restore Clay to normal can be found. In "The Gray Knight", Clay is reanimated by the Cloud of Monstrox and used to try and destroy the other knights until Merlok 2.0 blasts him away to Nothing Hill. After "The Good, The Bad, and the Tightwad", Clay returns to the side of good. However, in "In his Majesty's Secret Service", Clay becomes affected by Ruina's magic causing him to become more aggressive and violent towards the Stone Monsters and others but cannot strike Ruina. In "Heart of Stone", it is revealed that Ruina is Clay's mother and Merlok's sister making Clay the biological maternal nephew of Merlok. Clay has incredible magical powers, and is re-petrified in order to stop him from hurting anyone. Later on, he regains his human form and heroic mindset, and helps to battle the Colossus of Ultimate Destruction.
 Princess Macy Halbert (voiced by Erin Mathews) – Princess Macy Halbert is one of the Nexo Knights, and is the only female in the team. Her parents are King and Queen Halbert, but King Halbert initially disagrees with her decision to join the knights. Her armor is red and her crest shows a dragon, and she carries a power mace in battle. Macy's vehicle is the Thunder Mace, a large motorcycle with twin cannons. However, in "Rock Bottom," Macy starts using a dragon-shaped vehicle named "Hotspur" that can fly, shoot fireballs, and combine with her battle suit.
 Lancelot "Lance" Richmond (voiced by Ian Hanlin) – Lance Richmond is one of the Nexo Knights who doesn't always have a positive attitude towards training and usually butts heads with Clay. He is very rich and displays a spoiled personality. His armor is white and his crest is a horse. His weapon is his namesake, a lance. Outside the Fortrex, his preferred means of travel is his Mecha Horse/Turbo Jouster, a robotic horse that can convert into a motorcycle. Both forms possess a larger version of Lance's trademark weapon. In "Greed is Good?," it was revealed that Lance became a knight because his parents forced him to become one during his childhood instead of becoming a celebrity. Starting "A Little Rusty," Lance drives the Twin Jouster that can detach its back half to become faster.
 Aaron Fox (voiced by Alessandro Juliani) – Aaron Fox is one of the Nexo Knights who enjoys thrills. His armor is green and his crest is a fox, and he employs a Blazer Bow as his main weapon. Aaron enjoys employing his knight shield as a hover board, and often attacks from the air. Aside from his shield, his main choice of transportation is a crossbow-shaped fighter jet called the Bow Flyer. Upon Clay's transformation to stone, Aaron was made into the new leader for the Nexo Knights until Merlok 2.0 can find a way to restore Clay to normal. After "In Charge", Aaron drives a new vehicle called the Rock Climber.
 Axl (voiced by Brian Drummond) – Axl is the largest of the Nexo Knights. He loves food and is the strongman of the team. His armor is yellow and his crest is a bull, and he wields a massive battleaxe. When in need of a vehicle he boards the Tower Carrier, a truck pulling a detachable small tower. Later on, Axl drives a new vehicle called the Rumble Maker, which has large twin drills up front and can transform into an aerial vehicle.

Supporting characters
 Merlok 2.0 (voiced by Brian Drummond) – A digital wizard that helps the Knights defeat evil by sending them Nexo Powers. Merlok was originally a flesh-and-blood wizard who was the last wizard in the kingdom of Knighton where he was a member of the Wizards' Council. It was magic that saw the defeat of the monster armies 100 years previously. During this time, he was revealed to have a sister named Wanda Moorington who was also on the Wizards' Council before being turned evil by Monstrox and being petrified by Merlok. Due to Wanda being Merlok's sister, this makes Merlok the uncle of Clay which he refrained from telling upon gaining custody of him since he wanted to tell him when he was older. At some point, he became friends with King Halbert who would turn to him for wisdom upon becoming King Halbert's royal wizard. When Jestro first allied with the Book of Monsters, Merlok used his magic to drive them out of the capital city. The side effect of this magic caused Merlok to be absorbed into the castle's computers as a result. Fortunately, he was soon discovered by Ava. In the form of Merlok 2.0, he gained the ability to digitally transmit his magic to the Knights' weapons and armor to enable them to defeat the monsters. In "The Fall," Merlok 2.0 downloads his form into a robot body that is dubbed Mechlok.
 Robin Underwood (voiced by Erin Mathews) – Robin wants to become a Nexo Knight and is a first-year student at the Knights' Academy. His crest shows a chicken and he often employs the Fortrex's weapons during battles with the Lava Monster Army. Robin is known as the master mechanic who built the battle suits and more.
 Ava Prentis (voiced by Maryke Hendrikse) – Robin's friend and the resident tech expert who supports the Knights in their battle against evil. Ava is very sensible despite her young age, and usually assists the knights from the inside of their high-tech base. She has a knack for programming and high tech inventions such as the computer sword Techcalibur which enabled her to upload Merlok 2.0 into the Fortrex.
 King Halbert (voiced by Brian Drummond) – The King of Knighton, Queen Halbert's husband, and Princess Macy's father. Despite his position, he is rather timid and inclined to panic or worry at the first sign of trouble. King Halbert loves his wife and daughter but isn't entirely comfortable with Macy being one of the knights, and wouldn't have allowed her to graduate had it not been for his queen's intervention. Despite this, he does his best to aid the knights in their efforts to protect the kingdom including allowing them to overhaul his "Ye Old Royal RV" into their Fortrex base. King Halbert also commands a large humanoid mech when the need arises for him to go into battle.
 Queen Halbert (voiced by Nicole Oliver) – The Queen of Knighton, King Halbert's wife, and Macy's mother. Unlike her husband, Queen Halbert approves of Macy's desire to be a knight and seems much more confident in tense situations. Macy takes after her mother in terms of both appearance and fighting ability, and the queen is just as handy with a mace as her daughter.
 Hamletta – Lance's pet domestic pig. She lives with the knights, Ava, Robin, and Merlock 2.0 in the Fortrex. She debuted in "The Book of Total Badness". When Lance was held hostage by the Lava Monster Army, he was imprisoned in a pig pen where he met and befriended Hamletta. He kept her as a pet after the other knights freed him.
 Haute FancyPants – A Kingbot who is the personal attendant of King Halbert and Queen Halbert.
 Herb Herbertson (voiced by Brian Drummond) – Knighton's resident newscaster on the Knighton News Network (or KNN for short) who recaps past events at the beginning of each new episode.
 Alice Squires (voiced by Nicole Oliver) – A robot newscaster who assists Herb Herbertson on the Knighton News Network.
 Chef Eclair (voiced by Brian Drummond) – A Chefbot that cooks different meals for the inhabitants of Knightonia's castle. He is considered to be Axl's favorite robot as Chef Eclair never gets tired of cooking for the endless eater.
 Robots – The Kingdom of Knighton is home to a number of robots who serve various tasks such as helping defend the kingdom or providing the knights with training partners. Some of the more notable models are:
 Squirebots – The helpful robots who fight to defend the kingdom.
 Dennis – A Lancebot who is Lance's personal attendant where he has taken care of Lance since he "wore armored diapers." Dennis quit working for Lance in "The Book of Total Badness," but came back at the end of "The Might and the Magic" on the condition that Lance serves him once a week. In "Storm Over Rock Wood," Dennis quits working for Lance to join Robot Hoodlum's Merry Mechs.
 Claybot – The Squirebot of Clay who wields a Claymore. The Claybots  can oil swords and sharpen the boots.
 Macybot – A Squirebot who was originally commissioned by King Halbert to teach Macy how to be a princess. Although it has been reprogrammed by Ava when Macy became a knight, it still has some of its old programming left.
 Aaronbot – The Squirebot for Aaron who is dedicated to Aaron's safety. The Aaronbot can help calculate risk and assert dangerous situations.
 Axlbot – A Squirebot who serves Axl in going back and forth from the kitchen to get Axl's food. Its weakness is that it tends to have a bad sense of direction.
 Deputybots - Squirebot cowboys employed by Jorah Tightwad that live in the west, specifically in the town of Nothing Hill.
 Royal Soldiers – The obedient robots that serve the Knightonia Royal Family as soldiers. The Royal Soldiers tend to prefer to stand in long ranks then be thrown into battle against the attacking monsters.
 Chili Vanilla - A mech-hop group of two Squirebots.
 Sir Swordmore Brickland (voiced by Michael Adamthwaite) – The principal of the Knights Academy.
 Jorah Tightwad (voiced by Brian Drummond) – A wealthy "gold factory" owner who is somewhat full of himself. He obtained the Book of Envy when Merlok scattered the Books of Power across the kingdom, making him desire everything. He was robbed of the Book of Envy in "The King's Tournament" by Macy who in turn lost it to Jestro's forces. He harbours a hatred for the Nexo Knights in the fourth season due to the fact that they tend to foil his illicit attempts to make money for himself. He has a Scottish accent.
 Lotta Fun & Lotta Budget (voiced by Caitlyn Bairstow) – Tightwad's twin Squirebot assistants. Their personalities reflect their names with Lotta Fun being perky and upbeat, while Lotta Budget is more grumpy and money focused.
 Tighty Knighties – Tightwad's servants who serve as his counterparts of the Nexo Knights. Although they appear to be skilled with their weapons in tournaments, they are actually cowardly and inept at combat against Jestro and Monstrox's forces. Their names parody those of real-life celebrities.
 Shia LaBlade (voiced by Ian Hanlin) – The Tighty Knighties' counterpart of Clay who wields a double-bladed sword. His name is a reference to Shia LaBeouf.
 Jousting Bieber (voiced by Vincent Tong) – The Tighty Knighties' counterpart of Lance. His name is a reference to Justin Bieber.
 Brickney Spears (voiced by Maryke Hendrikse) – The Tighty Knigties' counterpart of Macy who wields a modified spear. She is named after Britney Spears.
 The Blok (voiced by Giles Panton) – The Tighty Knighties' counterpart of Axl who wields a sledgehammer. His name is a reference to Dwayne "The Rock" Johnson.
 Robot Hoodlum – A rebel Squirebot who lives in Rock Wood Forest. As the leader of the Merry Mechs, Robot Hoodlum steals from the rich and uses their money to take care of the many forgotten and disused robots that have joined up with the Merry Mechs. Robot Hoodlum is neither bad or good as he and the Merry Mechs represent their own side. In "Storm Over Rock Wood," the Cloud of Monstrox once used his evil lightning on Robot Hoodlum so that he can steal their shields. After Robot Hoodlum was defeated, Robin repairs him and he thanks the Nexo Knights by giving Lance four of his robots as Dennis joins up with the Merry Mechs. He is a parody of Robin Hood.

Villains
 Monstrox (voiced by Mark Oliver) – The main antagonist of the series. Monstrox was an evil arch-necromancer and former member of the Wizards' Council who terrorized Knighton with his monster armies and the Forbidden Powers a century ago prior to the events of the series until Merlok used all of his magic in a potent spell. In addition, he turned Wizards' Council member Wanda Moorington into Ruina Stoneheart. The spell turned Monstrox into a sentient book of dark magic known as the Book of Monsters, containing the essence of his monster army that can be summoned from his pages. Merlok also divided Monstrox's corruptive power within eleven spellbooks: The Book of Evil, The Book of Chaos, The Book of Fear, The Book of Anger, The Book of Deception, The Book of Destruction, The Book of Revenge, The Book of Greed, The Book of Envy, The Book of Cruelty, and The Book of Betrayal. Out of pride, Merlok did not destroy the books and housed them in his library to study them. At the start of the series, Monstrox is found by Jestro, concealing his true identity while persuading the jester to turn evil to aid him in regaining the books after Merlok sacrificed himself to scatter them across Knighton. In "The Fortrex and the Furious" after Jestro turned on him, Monstrox's true identity is revealed along with his need to possess a host body to regain human form. Monstrox originally intended to possess Jestro, but he decides to use Clay instead in "Kingdom of Heroes" where part of the ritual had Monstrox regurgitating the eleven spellbooks. Though Clay uses the Merlok 2.0-augmented Techcaliber to destroy the Book of Monsters, Monstrox survived and became a cloud-like being called the Cloud of Monstrox. Monstrox uses his lightning to corrupt Jestro again to aid him alongside the Stone Monster Army in retrieving both the cover of his old book body and his staff. Afterward, the Cloud of Monstrox leads Jestro and the Stone Monster Army into obtaining tablets containing the Forbidden Powers and place them into pillars at the top of Mount Thunderstrox to awaken the Colossus of Ultimate Destruction in order to destroy Knighton. In "Between a Rock and a Hard Place," the Cloud of Monstrox successfully awakens the Colossus of Ultimate Destruction and possesses it. In "The Fall," the Cloud of Monstrox guides the Colossus of Ultimate Destruction to Knightonia in order to destroy it. Clay, however, turns it into glass where it is shattered with the Cloud of Monstrox still in it.
 Jestro (voiced by Vincent Tong) – Jestro was once the king's court jester, and was constantly laughed at due to his clumsiness and not laughed at when he was trying to actually be funny. This allowed Monstrox to persuade him to turn to evil in order to take revenge on his former mockers. After stealing one of Merlok's magic staffs and getting his magic library scattered across the wilds of Knighton, Jestro is guided by Monstrox to retrieve the other books that contain his power. Despite giving in to the Book's pressure and being exposed to the Book of Evil and gaining a monstrous appearance, Jestro harbors doubts about his villainous role before learning he was intended to become Monstrox's new body once he regained his full power. In the season 2 finale, Jestro reforms completely and helps the Nexo Knights save Clay, reverting to his original appearance upon Monstrox's apparent destruction. But in season 3, while making failed attempts to make amends to no avail, Jestro encounters the Cloud of Monstrox, who uses his special evil lightning to control Jestro into helping him again, giving him an electrifying appearance and turning him even crazier than his original corruption. He reforms again after being freed from the Cloud of Monstrox' evil lightning and assists Roberto Arnoldi into cleaning up the shattered Colossus of Ultimate Destruction.
 Roberto Arnoldi (voiced by Vincent Tong) – Roberto Arnoldi is a sculptor who used to work for King Halbert and takes things very literally. One day, he was commissioned to make a "smashing" statue of Queen Halbert. When he literally made a smashing statue of Queen Halbert hammering some Scurriers and Globlins, Queen Halbert was pleased while King Halbert was displeased. After King Halbert fired him and kicked him out of Knightonia, Roberto settled in the Badlands near Mount Thunderstrox where he sold Stone Garden Gnomes that he carved in order to make money for himself. Upon meeting Jestro and the Cloud of Monstrox, Roberto sided with them in order to get revenge on Knightonia where he started by making versions of Stone Garden Gnomes that have pointy heads. Roberto later made a new mobile headquarters for Jestro and the Cloud of Monstrox after the Evil Mobile was accidentally rusted by the Rogul that was associated with the Forbidden Power of Relentless Rust. During the attack on Burningham, Roberto has sculpted a flying part of the mobile headquarters that was animated by the Cloud of Monstrox' lightning. Upon the Stone Colossus of Ultimate Destruction being reanimated, Roberto Arnoldi and Jestro are relieved of the Cloud of Monstrox's servitude. Following the Stone Colossus of Ultimate Destruction being turned to glass and shattering, Roberto Arnoldi and Jestro were seen cleaning up its remains.

Lava Monster Army
The Lava Monster Army is a group of fiery monsters made of lava that fight the Nexo Knights upon being summoned from the Book of Monsters by Jestro. When the members of the Lava Monster Army are defeated, they end up back in the Book of Monsters. In "Hot Rock Massage", it is revealed that the destruction of the Book of Monsters left them without a job. They wandered the kingdom until they found a Rogul containing the Forbidden Power of Blazing Burn and gained hope that they could build a town for them to live in called Burningham. After doing so, they ended up regretting the crimes they had done under the Book of Monsters' control and were no longer interested in fighting. The Nexo Knights teach them to fight again when the Stone Monster Army planned to steal the Rogul from their town. At the end of the episode, the Lava Monster Army ends up reverting to their old ways such as fighting each other.

Among the members of the Lava Monster Army are:

 General Magmar (voiced by Garry Chalk) – A lava monster who is Jestro's chief strategist, warrior, and cook. Back when Monstrox still had a body, General Magmar served as Monstrox's right-hand man. He debuted in Season Two where he is first seen leading the Lava Monster Army into robbing from Lance's parents and organizing the monster castle. In Season Three, General Magmar becomes the Mayor of Burningham and the new leader of the Lava Monster Army where he doesn't want to work for the Cloud of Monstrox again because of how the Nexo Knights defeating them constantly.
 Bookkeeper – A dim-witted humanoid lava monster that carries the Book of Monsters around. It serves no other apparent function and tends to screw up. In Season 3, the Bookkeeper becomes a glockenspiel performer. During this time, the Cloud of Monstrox didn't know that the Bookkeeper can talk.
 Burnzie (voiced by Giles Panton) – A large horned lava monster with massive teeth who is best friends with Sparkks. He and Sparkks make up the muscle of the Lava Monster Army. Burnzie and Sparkks are large enough to pull Jestro's Evil Mobile.
 Sparkks (voiced by Alessandro Juliani) – A large horned cycloptic lava monster with bat-like wings on his back who is best friends with Burnzie. Together, they make up the muscle of the Lava Monster Army. Burnzie and Sparkks are large enough to pull Jestro's Evil Mobile.
 Beast Master (voiced by Giles Panton) – An eyepatch-wearing lava monster who specializes in ordering the other Lava Monsters around to do Jestro's bidding such as constructing and then propelling Jestro's Evil Mobile. He wields two chains with Globlins at the other end of them.
 Lavaria (voiced by Nicole Oliver) – A sneaky lava monster who serves as Jestro's chief spy. It is hinted in her LEGO.com description and the episode "The Golden Castle" that she was in love with Jestro and vice versa. In Season 3, Lavaria has become a yoga teacher in Burningham.
 Whiparella (voiced by Nicole Oliver) – A female lava monster with a snake tail instead of legs. She carries a pair of whips that can cause anyone struck by them to have their greatest fears come to life. Jestro gained the ability to summon her after feeding the Book of Fear to the Book of Monsters which resulting in Whiparella's abilities. In Season 3, Whiparella has become a street artist in Burningham.
 Flama (voiced by Ian Hanlin) – A molten lava monster with a ghostly tail who is the twin brother of Moltor. In Season 3, Flama works at the Hot Rock Cafe in Burningham.
 Moltor – A black-skinned lava monster with rocky fists who is the twin brother of Flama. In Season 3, Moltor works at the Hot Rock Cafe in Burningham.
 Flame Throwers – Lava monster soldiers in mohawks with infernal insides. Like Crust Smasher, Jestro was able to summon them after feeding the Book of Cruelty to the Book of Monsters.
 Crust Smashers – Hard-skinned lava monster soldiers. Jestro was able to summon them after feeding the Book of Cruelty to the Book of Monsters.
 Ash Attackers – Armored lava monster soldiers made up of volcanic ash that wear horned helmets. Some of the Ash Attackers feature bat-like wings.
 Globlins – A bunch of spherical lava monsters who lack limbs, but attack with their large mouths full of sharp teeth and are one of the most numerous lava monsters at Jestro's command. In the book "Lego Nexo Knights: The Book of Monsters," it is mentioned that it takes 24 Globlins to combine into a Bloblin.
 Spider Globlins – A version of the Globlins with spider-like legs that came to be after the Book of Monsters consumed the Book of Fear that also enabled Whiparella to be summoned. The Spider Globlins are commanded by Whiparella.
 Scurriers – A bunch of diminutive pear-shaped, goblin-like, lava monsters who are one of the most numerous lava monsters at Jestro's command. He gained the ability to summon them after feeding the Book of Chaos to the Book of Monsters.
 Infernoxs – Gigantic lava monsters with gaping maws and huge hammers. Jestro gained the ability to summon them after feeding the Book of Destruction to the Book of Monsters. Like Burnzie and Sparkks, Infernoxs can also pull Jestro's Evil Mobile.

Stone Monster Army
The Stone Monster Army is a group of rock monsters that are reanimated by the Cloud of Monstrox's lightning even after being re-petrified by normal attacks. When a combo attack defeats the Stone Monsters, they are destroyed with the animating energies sucked back into the Cloud of Monstrox. Upon the Colossus of Ultimate Destruction being turned into glass by Clay and being shattered, most of the Stone Monster Army fled.
Among the members of the Stone Monster Army are:

 Ruina Stoneheart (voiced by Heather Doerksen) – A female statuesque Stone Monster who is the Stone Monster Army's residential witch and was first introduced in "Rock Bottom". She is given the task of capturing the 'heart' of the kingdom Macy's mother. In "Heart of Stone", she reveals to Clay that she is his mother. In the following episode "Between a Rock and a Hard Place," Merlok tells Ruina's sad tale, in which he reveals that Ruina was actually his sister Wanda Moorington and was a member of the Wizard's Council before she became unwillingly evil through Monstrox's influence. Though she struggled bravely to suppress the evil magic she had been infected with, even with the help of her brother, Merlock, she eventually failed and was twisted over to the dark side with Monstrox, forcing Merlock to turn her, his own sister, into stone. Years later, the Cloud of Monstrox reanimates her with his evil lightning. After Clay was turned to stone, Ruina starts to make her own plans for her son. Upon the Colossus of Ultimate Destruction being turned into glass and shattering, Ruina Stoneheart claims a glowing fragment of the Colossus of Ultimate Destruction for her next plans.
 General Garg (voiced by Noel Johansen) – A black gargoyle-like Stone Monster that serves as the general of the Stone Monster Army and a member of Jestro and the Cloud of Monstox's inner circle. He first appeared in "Miner Setback" where he assists Jestro and the Cloud of Monstrox into abducting the people of Diggington so that they can help excavate Reex, Roog, and Rumble. Unlike most of his kind, he is relatively intelligent and well-modulated.
 Lord Krakenskull (voiced by Noel Johansen) – A Stone Monster warlord who can combine Forbidden Powers. According to his backstory, he created the Forbidden Power of Petrified Quake by combining two other Forbidden Powers together where this ability allows his Krakenbeast to generate earthquakes and petrify objects with a roar. Though he lost control and petrified himself and his army where they were all buried underground. He only speaks in an indecipherable language referred to as "Kraken," though many of his fellow Stone Monsters and Monstrox tend to understand him when he is reanimated by the Cloud of Monstrox.
 Krakenbeast – Lord Krakenskull's monstrous, draconic-like steed that harnesses his combined Forbidden Powers. It wields the ability to track down the Forbidden Powers by scent.
 Three Brothers – The Three Brothers are three terrible granite golems that nearly defeated the original Wizards Council only to be buried underground by them under a mountain.
 Reex (voiced by Jason Simpson) – A Stone Monster with a left eyepatch who is the younger brother of Roog and Rumble.  According to legends, he was the fastest of the Three Brothers and was able to dodge a magic bolt and is the most quick-tempered.
 Roog (voiced by Jason Simpson) – A Stone Monster who is the middle brother of Reex and Rumble. He is said to be a master strategist and the smartest of the Three Brothers.
 Rumble (voiced by Jason Simpson) – The vehicle-type Stone Monster with an underbite that is the older brother of Reex and Roog and the largest of the Three Brothers. He is said to have the strength of twenty men and be immune to pain. As Rumble lost his original body in an earlier battle, his vehicle-type body was sculpted by Roberto Arnoldi where it sports a catapult that can launch smaller Stone Monsters at the Nexo Knights.
 Harpies – These Harpies are a trio of flying Stone Monsters that are good at grabbing and "old friends" of Monstrox. The Harpies were originally statues in a swamp until they were reanimated by the Cloud of Monstrox. They are the female counterparts to the Gargoyles, but are more intelligent and vicious than the Gargoyles.
 Hilda – A Harpy.
 Ingrid – A Harpy.
 Ulrika – A Harpy.
 Roguls – A bunch of humanoid Stone Monsters with twister-like bottoms. The Roguls were made to guard the Forbidden Powers. In the episode "A Little Rusty," a Rogul that was holding a tablet containing the Forbidden Powers of Relentless Rust is awaken by the Cloud of Monstrox where the Rogul's touch can rust anything metal including metal ore in rock. In "Mount Thunderstrox," the Rogul associated with the Forbidden Powers of Relentless Rust accidentally rusted the Evil Mobile. In "Rotten Luck", a Rogul was discovered guarding the Forbidden Power of Ravaging Rot in an unnamed swamp where the petrified forms of the three Harpies resided where they are all awakened. This Rogul's ability can induce rot in wood and anything edible. In "Knight at the Museum," a Rogul that guards the Forbidden Power of Collapsing Crumble that makes rock and stone crumble to dust, was on display at the Knighton Art Museum until it was awakened by the Cloud of Monstrox and its ability destroyed the Knighton Art Museum. In "Hot Rock Massage," the Nexo Knights claim the Rogul that contained the Forbidden Power of Blazing Burn than can set anything on fire while Beast Master posed as the Rogul to fool Jestro and the Cloud of Monstrox. In "In Charge," Jestro and the Cloud of Monstrox were able to do two different attacks where they were able to claim the Rogul that had the Forbidden Power of Blazing Burn. In "The Gray Knight," Jestro and the Cloud of Monstrox get their hands on the Rogul associated with the Forbidden Power of Shocking Scare which temporarily removes courage from anyone. In "The Strange in the Halps," Jestro and the Cloud of Monstrox claim the Rogul associated with the Forbidden Power of Devious Demolition which causes parts of rock structures to break off. In "Krakenskull," Jestro and the Cloud of Monstrox obtain the Forbidden Power of Metal-Morphosis which enables its wielder to turn gold into lead. In "Heart of Stone," Jestro and the Cloud of Monstrox obtain the Roguls that are associated with the Forbidden Power of Malicious Melting which melts snow targets, the Forbidden Power of Evil Evaporate which evaporates any liquid, and the Forbidden Power of Confounding Confusion which eliminates the victim's intelligence, but Confounding confusion is destroyed by Clay. In the episode "Between a Rock and a Hard Place," Jestro and the Cloud of Monstrox obtain the final Rogul that is associated with the Forbidden Power of Awesome Annihilation which can reduce towns to oblivion with a single explosive blast. Unlike the rest of the Stone Monster Army, the Roguls were eventually all returned to their statue state after the defeat of the Monstrox-possessed Colossus.
 Gravellers – A group of round Stone Monsters that are one of the foot soldiers of the Stone Monster Army.
 Bouldrons – A group of wheel-shaped Stone Monsters that are one of the foot soldiers of the Stone Monster Army.
 Stone Gnomes – A group of pointy-headed garden gnomes created by Roberto Arnoldi and brought to life by the Cloud of Monstrox to strengthen the Stone Monster Army. They can launch themselves head first into their enemies like missiles.
 Bricksters – A group of brick-themed Stone Monsters that are one of the foot soldiers of the Stone Monster Army.
 Stone Stompers – A group of Stone Monsters that serve as the ground foot soldiers of the Stone Monster Army.
 Gargoyles – A group of gargoyles reanimated by the Cloud of Monstrox that serve as the aerial foot soldiers of the Stone Monster Army.
 Grimrocs – A group of large terracotta-made Stone Monsters that were petrified by Merlok during his fight with them and Monstrox in Rock Wood Forest. Some versions of them have wings. The Grimrocs were later reanimated by the Cloud of Monstrox during his fight with the Nexo Knights in Rock Wood Forest.
 Colossus of Ultimate Destruction – A gigantic Stone Monster that the Cloud of Monstrox plans to reawaken upon collecting 10 Forbidden Powers which is buried within Mount Thunderstrox. It possesses the ability to harness each of the Forbidden Powers stored within its crown. It was  awoken and possessed by the Cloud of Monstrox in "Between a Rock and a Hard Place," and, using it, Monstrox to full command of the Stone Monster Army, but was eventually destroyed in "The Fall" when it was turned into glass by Clay and shattered. While Jestro and Roberto Arnoldi are cleaning up its remains, Ruina Stonehart steals a glowing fragment.

CyberBiters
The third wave of Nexo Knights action figures features the CyberBiters which are a group of cybernetic vampires infected by Monstrox's computer virus. Due to the show stopping production, they only appear in the toyline.

 Count Dragov - The leader of the CyberBiters, father of Fred and Pola and former member of the Wizards' Council. He gets corrupted by Monstrox's virus to help him takeover Knighton once again by stealing the Nexo Powers and to destroy Merlok 2.0 along with the Nexo Knights.
 Fred - A member of the CyberBiters and the twin brother of Pola.
 Pola - A member of the CyberBiters with a cybernetic right eye and the twin sister of Fred.
 Cezar - A member of the CyberBiters with spider-like legs who acts as an assassin.
 Berserker - A member of the CyberBiters who pilots a bomber who acts as a brute.
 Vanbyter No. 307 -
 Vanbyter No. 407 -
 CyberCritters - small insects that spread Monstrox's computer virus all across Knighton.
 InfectoByters - A group of corrupted cybernetic vampires that are the foot soldiers of the CyberBiters.
 MegaByter - A InfectoByter that ride on a Vyro Glyder.
 MechaByter - A InfectoByter that rides on a Vyro Suit.
 Cyberbyters - A group of Squirebots infected by Monstrox's virus.

Forest Monster Army
The Forest Monster Army is a group of monsters seen in the book "Lego Nexo Knights: The Book of Monsters" and have not yet appeared in the TV series. They consist of twisted plants and fungus.

Among the members of the Forest Monster Army are:

 Mushlord - A mushroom-themed Forest Monster who is the leader of the Forest Monster Army.
 Baron Badwood - A tree-type Forest Monster and commander of the Forest Monster Army that wields a sword made out of flies.
 Dame Flora - A flower-type Forest Monster who serves as the chief gardener of the Forest Monster Army.
 Bramblina - A grape-type Forest Monster who wields thorny vine-like whips.
 Loggerhead - A tree-themed Forest Monster that uses a cane. As Loggerhead has no brain, there is a woodpecker living in him that helps him by telling him which way to go.
 Deadwood and Knot - Deadwood is a tree-themed Forest Monster and Knot is a sentient knot of wood on Deadwood's belt whose real name is Addison Posh St. Claire III. As Deadwood is easily confused, the short-tempered Knot has to constantly monitor him. Deadwood is known to enjoy woodcarving and building campfires much to the chagrin of Knot.
 Berry Globlins - A group of berry-type Globlins that are commanded by Bramblina. They shoot exploding seeds and cause stains in clothes that don't come out.
 Shrooms of Doom - A group of small mushroom-type Forest Monsters that work for Mushlord.
 Elm of the Dark Realm - A giant tree monster.

Sea Monster Army
The Sea Monster Army is a group of monsters seen in the book "Lego Nexo Knights: The Book of Monsters" and have not yet appeared in the TV series. They consist of humanoid sea creatures that travel on a pirate ship that is powered by electric eels.

Among the members of the Sea Monster Army are:

 Marquis de Seaweed - The leader of the Sea Monster Army who wields a trident. He has a pet piranha named Shredder and once dated a sea urchin.
 Mate Squiddybeard - The commander of the Sea Monster Army with tentacles for a beard and a crab-like claw for a left hand. He enjoys sushi and once dated a coral.
 Chef Savage - The chef of the Sea Monster Army with a headband over his left eye and a trident-like prong for a left hand who owns his own restaurant. Chef Savage is said to cook better than General Magmar.
 Poop and Deck - The fish-like waiters that work for Chef Savage.
 Sharkerado - A knight-armored shark-type member of the Sea Monster Army who wields a mace-tipped flail and specializes in crossing moats.
 Siren - A mermaid-type member of the Sea Monster Army.
 Behemoth of Brine - A giant sea monster that is the largest member of the Sea Monster Army. Its forehead resembles a tropical island and once dated an iceberg.

Other characters
 Goldie Richmond (voiced by Jennifer Hayward) – Lance's mother.
 Cuthbert Richmond (voiced by Brian Drummond) – Lance's father.
 Izzy Richmond (voiced by Caitlyn Bairstow) – Lance's little sister who attends the Knights' Academy alongside Fletcher Bowman. Originally appearing as a main character in the "Knights Academy" spin-off books series, Izzy made her cartoon debut in the Season 4, episode "Weekend at Halbert's", where she is shown visiting the Fortex as part of a Knights' Academy student field trip. In the book series, she is described as being a talkative and excitable young knight, who isn't a fan of all the media attention that comes with being a Richmond.
 Fletcher "Fletch" Bowman (voiced by Sam Vincent) – An orphan from the countryside who attends the Knights Academy alongside Izzy Richmond. Originally appearing as a main character in the "Knights' Academy" spin-off books series, Fletcher made his cartoon debut in "Weekend at Halbert's", where he is shown visiting the Fortex as part of a Knights Academy student field trip. In the book series, Fletcher is shown to be a bit clueless in regards to his knight training, while subsequently demonstrating a talent for sorcery. It was to be revealed later on that he is the son of Ruina Stoneheart and Clay's younger brother, left by his mother before she succumbed to evil.
 Axlina (voiced by Brian Drummond) - Axl's younger sister. She has a crush on Robin.
 Coughmeyer (voiced by Colin Murdock) - The mayor of Snottingham.
 Edvard Evanson (voiced by Ian Hanlin) - The curator at the Knighton Official Museum of Art. He has an intense dislike for Roberto Arnoldi.
 Gobbleton Rambley (voiced by Alan Marriott) – A Knighton celebrity chef that Axl admires that was a culinary classmate to Chef Eclair. He is a parody of Gordon Ramsay. Though he is seen to be always angry on camera, he is timid off-camera.
 Hadda Hammerin (voiced by Lisa Bunting) - The mayor of the town Hammerin and cousin to the Queen.
 Lance cosplayer (voiced by Michael Daingerfield) – A kid cosplaying as Lance at Knight-A-Con as seen in "The Book of Obsession."
 Jokes Knightly (voiced by Michael Daingerfield) – A washed-up comedian who is Jestro's hero and the reason why he became a jester.
 Jurgen von Stroheim (voiced by Ian Hanlin) – A Knighton film director. He first appears in "The Golden Castle" as the director of the remake of the titular film. He becomes a heavily recurring character in Season 3 where he is first seen directing the Tighty Knighties' music video and then later working alongside Lance to try and film a Nexo Knights reality holovision show. Jurgen shows respect towards leading actors, but he disrespects extras believing them to be nothing more than "talking props."
 Jack Shields (voiced by Ian Hanlin) – A member of the King's secret service who trains Clay on how to be a spy. He is a parody of James Bond.
 Maynard - Lance's agent.
 Roger the Scrubber (voiced by Vincent Tong) - The mayor of Cleanington who owns the Scrubbery Barn.
 Sir Griffiths (voiced by Michael Adamthwaithe) - A teacher and old acquaintance of Principal Brickland who is portrayed with a southern drawl.
 Slab Rockowski (voiced by Kirby Morrow) – A magician and demolitions expert who is an old friend of Merlok's.

References

Bibliography 
 Lego Nexo Knights: Meet the Knights. Authored by Julia March. Published by Dorling Kindersley, 2016. 
 LEGO Nexo Knights: The Book of Knights. Authored by Julia March. Published by Dorling Kindersley, 2016. 
 LEGO NEXO KNIGHTS The Book of Knights : Includes Exclusive Merlok Minifigure. Published by Dorling Kindersley, 2016. 
 Lego NEXO Knights: The Knight's Code. Published by Ladybird, 2016. 
 LEGO Nexo Knights: Book of Monsters. Authored by Ameet Studio. Published by Scholastic, 2016. 
 LEGO NEXO KNIGHTS: Nexo Power Rules. Published by Ladybird, 2016. 
 LEGO Nexo Knights: Graduation Day. Published by Scholastic, 2016. 
 Nexo Knights Handbook (Lego Nexo Knights). Authored by Tracey West. Published by Scholastic, 2016. 
 LEGO NEXO KNIGHTS Ultimate Sticker Collection. Authored by Emma Grange and Rosie Peet. Published by Dorling Kindersley, 2016. 
 Lego NEXO Knights: No Rest for the Heroes. Published by Ladybird, 2016. 
 LEGO NEXO KNIGHTS Monster Battles. Authored by Julia March. Published by Dorling Kindersley, 2016. 
 POWER OF THE FORTREX. Authored by Schmidt. Published by Scholastic, 2016. 
 POCKET BOOK OF POWERS. Authored by Len Forgione. Published by Scholastic US, 2017. 
 MOVIE MAGIC #2. Authored by Rebecca L Schmidt. Published by Scholastic US, 2017. 
 STONE MONSTER ATTACK #3 W FIG. Published by Scholastic US, 2017. 
 NEXO KNIGHTS Build Your Own Adventure. Authored by Simon Hugo. Published by Dorling Kindersley, 2017. 
 LEGO NEXO KNIGHTS Build Your Own Adventure : With Minifigure and exclusive model. Authored by Simon Hugo. Published by Dorling Kindersley, 2017. 
 NEXO KNIGHTS Character Encyclopedia. Authored by Rona Skene. Published by Dorling Kindersley, 2017. 
 LEGO NEXO KNIGHTS: The Book of Monstrox. Authored by LEGO. Published by Ladybird, 2017. 
 LEGO NEXO KNIGHTS: Book of Mazes. Authored by LEGO. Published by Ladybird, 2017. 
 LEGO Nexo Knights: #2 Movie Magic. Authored by Rebecca L Schmidt. Published by Scholastic, 2017. 
 World of NEXO Knights Official Guide. Published by Scholastic, 2017. 
 LEGO NEXO KNIGHTS: Stone Monster Attack!. Authored by LEGO. Published by Ladybird, 2017. 
 Lego Nexo Knights: Stone Monster Attack! + Minifigurine. Published by Scholastic, 2017. 
 LEGO Nexo Knights Academy : The Forbidden Power. Published by Scholastic, 2017. 
 LEGO NEXO KNIGHTS Character Encyclopedia : Includes Exclusive Clay Minifigure. Published by Dorling Kindersley, 2017. 
 Lego Nexo Knights: Power Up!. Authored by Rebecca L Schmidt. Published by Published by Scholastic, 2017. 

Nexo Knights
Lego